State Road 16 (SR 16) runs from northwest to southeast between Raiford and St. Augustine. It passes through the towns of Starke and Green Cove Springs in addition to providing access to Camp Blanding. Major roads and/or highways that SR 16 crosses include: US 301, SR 21, US 17, SR 13, Interstate 95 and US 1.

Route description

The route begins at Florida State Road 121 in Raiford and runs straight east. After passing the Union Correctional Institute, and a furniture factory across from a forest, it curves southeast to cross a bridge over the New River, thus crossing the Union-Bradford County Line. From there it runs between the Florida State Prison and New River Correctional Institute, and remains at this general trajectory until it reaches Starke. 

After passing under the diamond interchange with U.S. Route 301 Alternate (Starke Bypass), the road enters the northern edge of downtown Starke, where it encounters the intersection with CR 229 and makes a curve more towards the east before intersecting US 301. Five blocks later, it has a grade crossing with the two tracks of the CSX Wildwood Subdivision then four blocks later, curves directly east once again.  Leaving the city, the road bends slightly to the northeast and later crosses the Bradford-Clay County Line where it then encounters a sharp left curve to the north at a wye intersection with the eastern terminus of SR 230, only to curve back straight east again, where it has another intersection with the southern terminus of CR 225. These sharp curves are around the northwest shores of Kingsley Lake, and then the vicinity of Camp Blanding. The southwestern terminus of CR 215 provides a shortcut towards Jacksonville, but the main road leading to that city is found later as SR 21, north of Belmore.

East of SR 21, the road passes by the historic town of Penney Farms and then runs through Pass Station before crossing a bridge over Peters Creek. At the Clay County Fairgrounds, the route has a short overlap with Clay CR 315, a tri-county road running from Marion County through Putnam County almost towards Fleming Island. In Green Cove Springs, the road crosses the CSX Sanford Subdivision and the Clay County Historical Museum, then makes a sharp turn to the south at US 17, sharing an overlap with that route until the Leonard C Taylor Parkway, where it leaves US 17 and returns to the east.

SR 16 crosses the St. Johns River using the Shands Bridge.  This bridge connects Clay and St. Johns Counties.  The Shands is often considered an emergency alternative to the Buckman Bridge that is farther north.  The difference between both bridges is that the Buckman, which carries Interstate 295, has eight lanes  while the Shands has only two lanes. The Shands Bridge is expected to be retired and replaced with a wider bridge in the future as part of the First Coast Expressway project.

After the bridge, the road has a wye intersection with SR 13, and turns southbound again in another overlap. As SR 16 turns east again, Route 13 is downgraded into St. Johns County Road 13, which runs along the east bank of the St. Johns River towards Spuds, Hastings, and even as far south as the vicinity of Bunnell. SR 16's eastern trajectory ends again at the southeastern terminus of CR 16A and southern terminus of Silverlake Parkway. It curves back to the east between CR 208 and Interstate 95 at Exit 318. The last CR 16A is at Lewis Speedway before the road crosses a bridge over the San Sebastian River and enters the historic City of Saint Augustine where it crosses the main line of the Florida East Coast Railroad just before the intersection with US 1. Florida State Road 16 ends two blocks later at San Marco Avenue (US Business Route 1).

Major intersections

Related routes

Clay County

CR 16A is a county road in Clay County. It is a suffixed spur of SR 16 located just west of the city of Green Cove Springs serving residences around the northwest quadrant of Kingsley Lake.

St. Johns County

CR 16A is a county road in St. Johns County, Florida. It is a spur of SR 16 in northwestern St. Johns County. It goes through mainly rural land. It begins at SR 13 just north of the Shands Bridge and continues about 1.5 miles before making a junction with County Road 210 afterwards it continues until its end at SR 16 near World Golf Village. It is the older alignment of SR 16, ending at SR 13 at the Old Shands Bridge pier.

References

External links

016
016
016
016
016